Renato Cataldi (born December 25, 1909, São Paulo, Brazil; died May 29, 1981, Rio de Janeiro, Brazil) was a Brazilian painter.  Cataldi is catalogued in the Julius Louzada's Dictionary of Arts, and won several awards from the annual Salon organised by Escola Nacional de Belas Artes.

Cataldi, who lived and painted in and around the city of Rio de Janeiro, focused on landscapes, seascapes, marine subjects and nature scenes featuring exotic birds of various species from trees, as if they were loose in nature.  His paintings often appear at large international auction houses.

References

1909 births
1981 deaths
People from São Paulo
20th-century Brazilian painters
20th-century Brazilian male artists